Kiran Chandra Roy is a Bangladeshi Baul folk singer. In 1997, he won Bangladesh National Film Award for Best Male Playback Singer and the BACHSAS Best Singer Award for his performance in the film Dukhai. He is also a lyricist and music composer.

Background and education
Roy took formal music lessons from Khandaker Nurul Alam for 14 years. He took part in first Bangladesh folklore workshop. He was a student of Bengali Literature at the University of Dhaka and Jagannath University.

As of 2005, Roy released 15 solo albums and rendered playback in over 20 films.

Albums
 Kon Kaal-e Tor Hobe Dishe (2014)

References

External links
 

Living people
Bangladeshi Hindus
Bangladeshi folk singers
Bangladeshi playback singers
20th-century Bangladeshi male singers
20th-century Bangladeshi singers
Best Male Playback Singer National Film Award (Bangladesh) winners
Place of birth missing (living people)
Year of birth missing (living people)
21st-century Bangladeshi male singers
21st-century Bangladeshi singers